We're in the Money is a 1935 American romantic comedy film directed by Ray Enright. It was released by Warner Bros. on August 17, 1935. The film stars Joan Blondell and Glenda Farrell and is one of five Warner Bros. films in which they were paired as blonde bombshell comedy duo. The other films include Havana Widows (1933), Kansas City Princess (1934), Traveling Saleslady (1935) and Miss Pacific Fleet (1935). Ginger and Dixie are two process servers, who serve legal papers to a playboy, a racketeer, a wrestler and a singer.

Plot
Ginger Stewart (Joan Blondell) and Dixie Tilton (Glenda Farrell) are offered $1000 by ditsy lawyer Homer Bronson (Hugh Herbert) to serve subpoenas on reluctant witnesses for a breach of promise lawsuit brought by Claire LeClaire against wealthy C. Richard Courtney (Ross Alexander). They have a deadline, as a new state law will take effect in a few weeks banning such suits. Unbeknownst to Ginger, she already knows the defendant; she and Courtney, masquerading as a chauffeur named Carter, have fallen in love. Courtney himself does not know that Ginger is a process server.

Through trickery, Ginger and Dixie manage to serve papers on three of their wary targets: nightclub singer Phil Logan (Phil Regan), gangster 'Butch' Gonzola, and professional wrestler Man Mountain Dean, the last in the middle of a bout with Chief Pontiac. Courtney, on the advice of his lawyer, Stephen Dinsmore (Henry O'Neill), prepares to sail away to safety on his yacht. However, Ginger jumps out of a motorboat piloted by the erratic Bronson and pretends to be in distress. She is rescued by Courtney's crewmen. She and Courtney finally learn each other's true identity, but eventually admit they love each other and decide to get married. Ginger sends a message to Dixie, asking her to bring a few things she will need for the honeymoon. However, Dixie assumes her partner is merely luring Courtney in, and when the couple set foot on the dock, Dixie serves the last subpoena. Courtney also assumes Ginger was merely acting and angrily breaks up with her.

At the trial, Bronson produces a photograph showing LeClaire cosily nestled in Courtney's lap. Courtney agrees to marry LeClaire. Later, however, Bronson confides to Ginger and Dixie that he faked the picture by combining two others. Ginger rushes over and stops the wedding ceremony just in time. She and Courtney then reconcile.

Cast

 Joan Blondell as Ginger Stewart
 Glenda Farrell as Dixie Tilton
 Hugh Herbert as Lawyer Homer Bronson
 Ross Alexander as C. Richard Courtney
 Hobart Cavanaugh as Max
 Phil Regan as Singer Phil Logan
 Anita Kerry as Claire LeClaire
 Henry O'Neill as Lawyer Stephen 'Dinsy' Dinsmore

Songs 
 [[The Gold Diggers' Song (We're in the Money)|We're in the Money]] –  music and lyrics by Al Dubin and Harry Warren. Background and sometimes hummed by the cast. 
 It's So Nice Seeing You Again'' – music and lyrics by Allie Wrubel and Mort Dixon. Sung by Phil Regan in the nightclub scene.

References

External links
 
 
 
 

1935 films
1935 romantic comedy films
American black-and-white films
American romantic comedy films
Films directed by Ray Enright
Films with screenplays by F. Hugh Herbert
1930s English-language films
1930s American films